Cedar Township is a township in Cowley County, Kansas, USA.  As of the 2000 census, its population was 44.

Geography
According to the USGS, it contains one cemetery, Rock Creek.

The streams of Acker Creek, Bear Creek, Branson Creek, Dog Run, Donahue Creek, Rush Creek, Spring Creek, Spring Creek and Whartenby Creek run through this township.

References
 USGS Geographic Names Information System (GNIS)

External links
 City-Data.com

Townships in Cowley County, Kansas
Townships in Kansas